The Royal Guard of Oman (RGO) (Arabic: الحرس السلطاني العماني) is the royal guard of the Sultan of Oman. It is a separate service within the Sultan's Armed Forces (SAF) and although equipped to carry out land defense operations, it is not part of the Royal Army of Oman. The RGO is a personal security and ceremonial unit responsible for the protection of the Sultan and other senior members of the Royal Family. 

There are two other Royal Household partner organizations which directly interface with the RGO, they are:
 The Oman Royal Yacht Squadron - based in Muscat Harbor with moorings for larger royal vessels in Muttrah's Port Sultan Qaboos 
 The Royal Flight of Oman - based at Muscat International Airport

History of the Force

The RGO can trace its history back to the small groups of lightly armed Askaris that guarded the palaces and forts of the Sultans of Oman, many habitually recruited from East Africa or loyal local tribesmen. However, it was His Majesty Sultan Qaboos bin Said that decided to develop a more structured approach to royal protection. The RGO originated from the Oman Gendarmerie, which in the early 1970s became His Majesty's Body Guard known as the Royal Guard Squadron. In 1975 the squadron developed into the Royal Guard Regiment and was responsible for the protection of His Majesty and his guests; and by default the security of royal residences (palaces, etc.) and the Sultan's travelling camps This unit was grown in size and evolved into the multi-function RGO of today.

Organisation

The RGO is organised as a light mixed capability brigade-sized formation of at least 4,500 but no more than 5,000 personnel. It is equipped with a variety of wheeled armoured and soft-skinned combat vehicles; as well as light and heavy support weapons. The RGO also has a ceremonial equestrian unit that is based at the Royal Stables at Seeb. The RGO's motorcycle VIP convoy escort specialists have also created a display team known as the Red Helmets. The RGO has ceremonial bands (including bagpipe bands) and a school of music. The RGO also administers the Royal Oman Symphony Orchestra and its own technical college, both based at separate sites in Seeb.

The following is the brigade's military structure:

 Headquarters Company
 Honour Guard Battalion
 RGO VIP Escort 
 Motorcycle Escort
 Mounted Escort
 Red Helmets
 Omani Royal Guard Military Band
 Infantry Band
 Royal Cavalry Mounted band
 Jazz Band 
 Steel Band
 Pipes and Drums
 Symphonic Orchestra
 School of Music
 Armoured Company
 Royal Guard of Oman Technical College

Base locations
The following are some of the official residences of the Sultan and will have a permanent RGO security presence:
The Al Alam Palace - Muscat, RGO personnel being billeted in the old Portuguese Fort Mirani adjacent to the palace
The Al Husn Palace - Salalah. The summer residence of the Sultan
The Qasar al Barakah Palace - Seeb
The Bayt al Mamoura Palace - Salalah. Also classed as a Royal Guesthouse
The Rubat Palace - Salalah
The Bait Bahjat al Andhar - Sohar
The Al Aman Barracks - Seeb. Headquarters and main force base, when there is no deployment.

Equipment
The RGO uses wheeled armoured fighting vehicles and is known to have:
Nine Italian Centauro 120mm (8x8) Mobile Gun Systems. These AFVs replaced older French VBC-90 mobile gun systems in the RGO inventory
56 French Renault Véhicule de l'Avant Blindé (VAB) (6x6), including VPM-81 (81mm mortar carrier) and VDAA TA20 (anti aircraft) variants
French Truck-mounted MBDA  VL MICA missile Ground Based Air Defense system.

See also

Sultan of Oman's Armed Forces
Royal Guard of Oman Technical College

References

External links
 

Military of Oman
Royal guards
Omani monarchy
Organizations based in Muscat, Oman
1970 establishments in Oman